Sherry Ayittey (born 1948) is a Ghanaian biochemist, politician and women's activist. Hanny Sherry Ayittey is a former Minister for Fisheries and Aquaculture Development. She was the Minister for Health from February 2013 to June 2014. She was the Minister for Environment, Science and Technology from 2009 to 2012.

Early life and education 
Sherry Ayittey was born in 1948. She had her secondary school education at the Labone Secondary School in Accra and is a member of the 1965-67 year group. She graduated with a Bachelor of Science in Biochemistry and Master of Science in industrial microbiology from the Kwame Nkrumah University of Science and Technology (KNUST), Kumasi, then University of Science and Technology (UST). She is also a fellow of American universities of management, namely, the Johns Hopkins University, Baltimore and Kellogg Graduate School of Management. Ayittey was involved in nongovernmental organization activities in Ghana. In February, 2013 she attended a leadership programme at Harvard University, Massachusetts, US.

Career 
Ayittey served as the managing director of Ghana Industrial Holding Corporation (GIHOC) Distilleries. She served on several management boards in Ghana including the Ghana Water and Sewerage Corporation now Ghana Water Company Limited (GWCL), Social Security and National Insurance Trust (SSNIT); Ghana Forestry Commission, and Ghana Export Promotion Council.

She was Ghana's lead of delegation to Conference of Parties (COP) of the United Nations Framework Convention on Climate Change, United Nations Convention to Combat Desertification and United Nations Convention on Biodiversity among others.

Ayitey was an attendant of the International Conference for Women in Beijing, China and the Africa Global Initiative Conference, Tokyo, Japan. She is also a fellow of the Institute of Directors, United Kingdom and a member of the Chartered Institute of Marketing (CIM), Ghana.

Politics 
Sherry Ayittey is a founding member of the National Democratic Congress (NDC). She has served in several roles within the party and in government, serving as a women's activist, a minister of state and a National Vice-chairperson.

Minister of Environment, Science and Technology
After the 2008 presidential election, President John Atta Mills appointed Ayittey as Minister for Environment, Science and Technology in his government in January 2009. She was a member of the 19 ministers that formed the cabinet of President John Atta Mills. During her tenure she had to work along with the Ministry of Energy in ensuring Ghana's first drill of oil and gas. She led the ministry to ensure that all environmental hazards has been taken into consideration. She also led the ministry in drawing an oil and gas master plan along with the Environmental Protection Agency (EPA) to integrate environmental management, health and safety and community issues into petroleum sector operations to ensure sustainable development. She represented President Atta Mills at the 2nd Commission Meeting of COMSATS in April 2012, where the President was appointed as the chairperson of the commission.

Ayittey served as the Chairperson of the United Nations Commission on Science and Technology (Geneva) and the African Regional Centre on Technology (Dakar). She was also a member of ECOWAS Board, Economic Community of West African States Regional Centre for Renewable Energy and Energy Efficiency (ECREEE) and was also a Council Member of the Global Environment Facility (GEF), Washington.

Minister of Health 
In January 2013, she was appointed Minister for Health by President John Dramani Mahama taking over from Alban Bagbin. She represented Ghana at international forums and conferences during her tenure including the 66th World Health Assembly and was one of the keynote speakers at the assembly on the assembly's event on climate change and air pollution.

Whilst serving as Health Minister, she made calls at the 2013 National Family planning week celebration in Ho, Volta Region, on the need for the Ghana Education Service (GES) to introduce the teaching of family planning in schools to enable the adolescent to understand and know more about their reproductive health. This was due to the huge numbers of teenage pregnancies in Ghana being caused as a result of lack of knowledge on reproductive health and family planning within the youth considering that an introduction of it in the curriculum would reduce the stigma associated with reproductive health. She also stated that traditional authorities and religious leaders should regularly bring in experts in family planning and reproductive health to sensitize their communities on the issues relating to those fields.

Whilst serving as health minister, she considered eye-care as a critical aspect of ensuring a healthy nation, which led to an initiative of the distribution of eye-glasses in collaboration with the Christian Health Association of Ghana (CHAG) to people living in rural communities in Ghana. In 2014, as the Minister of Health, she advocated for the training of more ophthalmologists in Ghana since there were only 74 trained ophthalmologists nationwide.

Minister of Fisheries and Aquaculture 
On 9 June 2014, Sherry Ayitey was reassigned by President Mahama to the Ministry of Fisheries and Aquaculture.

NDC National Vice-Chairperson 

In 2018, Ayittey declared her intentions to stand for the National Vice-chairmanship position for the NDC. She stood against along with Awudu Sofo Asorka, Said Sinare Yaw Owusu Obimpeh Lawyer Adu-Yeboah,  Alhaji Amadu Bukari Sorogho, Seth Ofosu-Ohene, Alhaji Sumaila Mahama and Dr. Kwame Ampofo. She campaigned and declared that her decision to stand for the position was on the agenda to ''Rebuild, Reposition and Regain the party values and principles among its grassroots base towards the 2020 Ghana elections.'' She succeeded in her bid to become a member of the party's national executive committee after the elections on 18 November 2018, she was voted to serve as one of the three vice chairpersons for the party with Awudu Sofo Asorka serving as 1st Vice, she serving as 2nd Vice and Said Sinare as the 3rd Vice.

Women's activism

31 December Women's Movement
She was involved with 31 December Women's Movement, a non governmental organization affiliated to the NDC, whose president is Nana Konadu Agyeman Rawlings, wife of the late Jerry Rawlings, former President of Ghana. She was the Projects and Programmes Officer of the organisation.

Controversies and allegations

Ghana Rubber Estates Limited (GREL) trial 
After the NDC lost the Ghanaian presidential election in December 2000, the New Patriotic Party came to power with John Kufuor forming his government. Various NDC activists stood trial for different reasons. Sherry Ayitey was put on trial with Nana Konadu Agyeman Rawlings in relation with the divestiture of the Ghana Rubber Estates Limited. Sherry Ayitey had been a member of the Divestiture Implementation Committee. Sherry Ayitey had decided to challenge the High Courts decision for Her to open Her defence. However, the Court of Appeal turned down Her request and asked that She opened Her defence in the High Court.

Giving evidence at the court under cross-examination, Emmanuel Amuzu Agbodo, former Executive Secretary of the Divestiture Implementation Committee (DIC), and one of the three accused persons said during his tenure of office, Hanny Sherry Ayitey, treasurer of 31 December Women's Movement did not approach him to seek any favours on behalf of SIPH. Whilst standing trial in the Ghana Rubber Estates Limited (GREL) divestiture case with two others, on Wednesday denied ever playing any role in the privatisation of the company. She told the court that as a co-opted member of the Divestiture Implementation Committee (DIC) she did not perform any function in respect of GREL's divestiture. Ayitey made these denials when she continued her evidence-in-chief at the Accra Fast Track Court hearing the case.

Sherry Ayitey told an Accra Fast Track Court that she never participated in any meeting of the Divestiture Implementation Committee (DIC) Board that discussed GREL's privatisation. Giving her evidence-in-chief, Hanny Sherry Ayitey, Treasurer of 31 December Women's Movement (DWM), told the Court that at the 37th Regular Meeting of the DIC, which she attended, members did not discuss anything in respect of GREL's privatisation. Ayitey, who is standing trial on corruption charges in connection with the divestiture process, told the Court that between January 1998 and October 1998, She was invited by the then Executive Secretary of the DIC Board to three of the Board's meetings. She said in spite of those three invitations to the 37th and 38th Regular Meetings and an Emergency Meeting, She could honour only the invitation to the 37th Regular Meeting.

In the course of the trial, Mr Justice J. C. Amonoo-Monney, the trial judge, acquitted and discharged Mrs Ocran for lack of evidence. At the end of the trial on 21 April 2005, the Court ruled that the Prosecution had failed to prove its case beyond all reasonable doubts against Mrs Ayittey and Mr Agbodo, and, therefore, freed them.

Honours and recognition 
In 1990, Ayittey was adjudged the Chartered Institute of Marketing Ghana (CIM) Marketing Woman of the year.

Personal life
Sherry Ayittey's older brother is the economist, George Ayittey

See also
 List of Mills government ministers
 National Democratic Congress

References

External links and sources
 Sherry Ayitey on Ghana Government website

Living people
1948 births
Environment ministers of Ghana
National Democratic Congress (Ghana) politicians
Health ministers of Ghana
Women government ministers of Ghana
Cabinet Ministers of Ghana
Kwame Nkrumah University of Science and Technology alumni
Ghanaian women activists